Angela Bowie (born Mary Angela Barnett; September 25, 1949) is an American model, actress, and journalist. Alongside her ex-husband David Bowie, she influenced the glam rock culture and fashion of the 1970s. She was married to Bowie (whom she assisted in conceptualizing the costumes for the Ziggy Stardust stage show) from 1970 until their divorce in 1980. They had one child together, film director Duncan Jones.

Early life 
Bowie was born Mary Angela Barnett in Ayios Dhometios (then in British Cyprus) on September 25, 1949, the daughter of Canadian mother Helena Maria Galas Barnett and American father George M. Barnett. Her father was a U.S. Army colonel who later worked as a mining engineer and ran a mill for the Cyprus Mines Corporation. She has a brother who is 16 years older than her. Both of her parents died in 1984.

Bowie is of English and Polish descent, and was raised Roman Catholic. She has identified as Cypriot due to the circumstances of her birth and early life, writing in 2000, "I am a Cypriot by disposition. I don't have a passport or Cypriot nationality but my heart is Cypriot, not Greek or Turkish Cypriot, just Cypriot." She was educated in Cyprus, Switzerland, and England (at Kingston Polytechnic), then moved to the U.S. to briefly attend Connecticut College until she was expelled after she had an affair with a fellow female student.

Career

Film and television 
During the 1970s, Bowie occasionally appeared as a guest on television talk shows. She appeared on The Tonight Show, hosted by Johnny Carson, on November 16, 1973. She also performed on The Mike Douglas Show in early 1975.

She auditioned for the title role in the 1974 television  movie Wonder Woman,with Cathy Lee Crosby getting the part. This should not be confused with the later television series Wonder Woman, starring Lynda Carter. Newsweek hypothesized in its February 11, 1974, issue that Angie Bowie lost out to Crosby because of her refusal to wear a bra.

Later in 1975, Bowie bought the television rights to Marvel Comics' characters Black Widow and Daredevil, hoping to develop and sell a series featuring the two heroes. She planned to play Black Widow, with actor Ben Carruthers as Daredevil. The series failed to secure a studio deal, and it never went beyond the development stage.

Georgie Ellis, (model, & daughter of Ruth Ellis), describes in her 1995 biography, ('Ruth Ellis, My Mother'), how Bowie was due to portray her mother in a 1979 filmography, subsequently un-produced. Ellis, (on page 194), wrote that she was 'Indignant' about this: '....her credentials for the role seemed to me to be non-existent '.

In March 1982, Bowie appeared on the television program The Old Grey Whistle Test, reciting poetry, while Mick Karn, from the band Japan, played bass. Her performance was lambasted by the British media.

Bowie appeared as herself in the D.A. Pennebaker concert film Ziggy Stardust and the Spiders from Mars (1973) and Glitter Goddess of Sunset Strip (1991). She also has had credited acting roles in at least four films: Eat the Rich (1987, as Henry's wife), Demented (1994), Deadrockstar (2002, as Bartender) and La Funcionaria Asesina (The Slayer Bureaucrat, 2009, as Helen Price/Constance).

On January 5, 2016, Bowie appeared on Celebrity Big Brother 17, where she finished in 12th place. On January 10, she was informed off screen of the death of her former husband David Bowie. Although she initially chose to stay in the house, she voluntarily decided to leave on January 19, in part on medical grounds.

Writing 

Bowie has written two autobiographies: Free Spirit (1981, including samples of the author's poetry), as well as the Backstage Passes: Life On the Wild Side with David Bowie, published in 1993 and updated in 2000. It detailed her alleged drug-fueled and openly bisexual lifestyle with her former husband and many other well-known musicians.  In 2014, she produced a large book about sex titled Pop Sex as well as a book about cats titled Cat-Astrophe. In 2015, she released the book Fancy Footwork: Poetry Collection.

Music 

The CD maxi-single "The World Is Changing", with six mixes, including prominent vocal support by Dabonda Simmons, was credited to Bowie with co-composers David Padilla, Morgan Lekcirt, Tom Reich, Jim Durban and D.J. Trance. It appeared in 1996 on New York label Warlock Records (distributed in Europe through Music Avenue on the Nite Blue label).  The cover featured a logo of the Bowie name clearly modeled on the one seen on her former husband's Let's Dance releases. The album Moon Goddess was released in 2002 on the record label The Electric Label.

She sang with Subterraneans vocalist Jude Rawlins on a version of the Rolling Stones song "The Last Time", also included on the 2003 Subterraneans album Orly Flight.

Journalism 

Bowie has reinvented herself as a journalist specializing in gender issues. She served as a "roving reporter" for the transgender and drag monthly Frock Magazine. In 2002, she wrote a Pocket Essentials book titled Bisexuality.

Personal life

Relationships 

She met musician David Bowie in London in 1969, at the age of 19. According to her, they met through their mutual friendship with record executive Calvin Mark Lee. The couple married one year later, on March 19, 1970, at Bromley Register Office in Beckenham Lane, Kent. They had an open marriage. She stated that they were not in love, and the union was a marriage of convenience. She told the Evening Standard, "We got married so that I could work [to get a permit]. I didn't think it would last and David said, before we got married, 'I'm not really in love with you' and I thought that's probably a good thing." Their son Duncan Zowie Haywood Jones was born on May 30, 1971. He later preferred to be known as Joe or Joey but has reverted to the name Duncan Jones. After nine years of marriage, Angie and David Bowie separated, and they divorced on February 8, 1980, in Switzerland. In the divorce settlement, she received £500,000, paid in installments, and a 10-year gagging clause. Not wanting to fight over custody, she left their son with David. She stated that David's drug habit had become so out of control that she believed giving him the responsibility of raising their son would stabilize him.

During her marriage, she often accompanied her husband on his international concert tours. He wrote the song "The Prettiest Star", about her. (During a backstage sequence in the concert film Ziggy Stardust and the Spiders from Mars, David calls Angie by the name Star). After the divorce, Bowie said she was blackballed from the entertainment industry and was so depressed that she considered suicide.

Following her divorce, Angela Barnett had a long-term relationship with punk musician Drew Blood (born Andrew Lipka); they had a daughter, Stacia Larranna Celeste Lipka (also referred to as Stasha). She later lived in Tucson, Arizona.

In 1993, she began a relationship with Michael Gassett, an electrical engineer nearly 20 years her junior. As of 2016 they lived in Acworth, Georgia.

Estrangement from Duncan Jones 

Bowie is estranged from her son Duncan Jones, saying in a 2010 interview that a reconciliation was unlikely. She also mentioned the estrangement during her 2016 appearance on Celebrity Big Brother. She previously said that, although she has not seen her son since he was 13, he had been in very brief contact with her daughter Stasha in the early 2000s. "He emailed me and I didn't know what to say. So I put them together. They corresponded for a bit and then that stopped. He is cold, like his father. David cut me off. Zowie, or Duncan, cut me and Stasha off", she said.

When asked by The Times in 2017 whether she had been in touch with her son since David Bowie's death the year before, she responded "My son? No, why should I be? I'm not interested. It stopped when my father changed his will to not include an educational trust fund for Zowie because David divorced me. When my father did that, I followed precedent. It's over. Nothing. Nothing to do with me." In a 2018 interview for the podcast WTF with Marc Maron, Jones reiterated that they never had reconciled, saying she was a "corrosive person."

Rolling Stones song "Angie"

Angie Bowie has long claimed to have inspired The Rolling Stones' hit song "Angie" from their 1973 album Goats Head Soup. However, the songwriters Mick Jagger and Keith Richards have consistently denied this. In 1993, in the liner notes to the Rolling Stones' compilation album Jump Back: The Best of The Rolling Stones, Richards said that the title was inspired by his newborn daughter, Dandelion Angela. Later, in his 2010 memoir Life, he said that he had chosen the name at random when writing the song and that it "was not about any particular person." According to NME, the lyrics of the song were inspired by Jagger's breakup with Marianne Faithfull.

Fictional portrayals 

The fictional character of Mandy, portrayed by Toni Collette in the film Velvet Goldmine, was based upon Bowie.

Bibliography 

Angela Bowie Free Spirit. The book was published by Mushroom Books, in 1981 (name appears as "Angie Bowie" on the cover).
Angela Bowie Backstage Passes. The book was published by Jove Books, The Berkeley Publishing Group, in 1993.

References

Interviews 

Interview from BlairingOut.com – Oct. 2012

External links 

1949 births
Living people
Actresses from Tucson, Arizona
Alumni of Kingston University
American autobiographers
American expatriates in Switzerland
American expatriates in England
American female models
American people of English descent
American people of Polish descent
People of Greek Cypriot descent
Bisexual musicians
Bisexual women
Connecticut College alumni
LGBT models
American LGBT musicians
People from Nicosia
Women autobiographers
American expatriates in Cyprus
21st-century American women